Emiliano Ariel Dudar (born 12 August 1981) is a retired Argentine central defender.

Career
Born in Buenos Aires, Dudar began his career in the youth ranks of Velez Sarsfield and made his First Division debut in 2000. During his debut season he was named Rookie of the Year by the Asociación del Fútbol Argentino. In over four years at the Buenos Aires club, he made 63 appearances and scored 5 goals. For the 2003–04 season he was loaned out to Independiente and was a regular starter appearing in 19 matches and scoring one goal. For the next few years he was loaned out to Banfield, Caracas, and Libertad. In 2005, he signed with Carabobo in Venezuela's top flight and remained at the club for one year before returning to Argentina. He signed with Tigre for the second half of the 2005 season and appeared in 15 games. His play with Tigre drew the attention of top Brazilian club Vasco da Gama. He joined Vasco in 2006 and appeared in 34 official matches for the club.

In 2007, he left for Europe, joining FC Chiasso of the Swiss Challenge League and appeared in 14 matches scoring 3 goals. He returned to Argentina in 2008 playing for Olimpo de Bahía Blanca. His prior experience in Switzerland led to his signing with Swiss side AC Bellinzona in the second half of the 2008–09 campaign, where he played in 16 matches and scored two goals. The following season, he joined BSC Young Boys. In his first year with Young Boys he was named the Swiss Golden Player as the league's top defender. He started in 31 matches that season scoring one goal. Dudar's second season with Young Boys was cut short as he was placed in a medically induced coma after suffering a severe head injury on 12 September 2010, when he accidentally clashed heads with teammate François Affolter. He was successfully woken up a day later.

He signed with D.C. United of Major League Soccer on 25 January 2012.

After one season with DC, Dudar returned to former club FC Chiasso of the Swiss Challenge League on 1 February 2013.

Half a year later, on 18 July 2013, he moved to league rivals FC Sion. He left Sion on January 20, 2014.

After taking a break on his career, Dudar signed with Deportivo Merlo on February 12, 2015. Dudar retired in 2016.

Honours
Closing Championship: 1998
Recopa: 1997
Venezuelan Championship: 2004

References

External links
 netvasco.com.br 
 Guardian Stats Centre
 

1981 births
Living people
Footballers from Buenos Aires
Argentine footballers
Argentine expatriate footballers
Club Atlético Vélez Sarsfield footballers
Club Atlético Independiente footballers
Club Atlético Banfield footballers
Club Libertad footballers
Club Atlético Tigre footballers
CR Vasco da Gama players
Caracas FC players
FC Chiasso players
AC Bellinzona players
BSC Young Boys players
Olimpo footballers
D.C. United players
FC Sion players
Deportivo Merlo footballers
Argentine Primera División players
Venezuelan Primera División players
Swiss Super League players
Swiss Challenge League players
Major League Soccer players
Expatriate footballers in Venezuela
Expatriate footballers in Brazil
Expatriate footballers in Paraguay
Expatriate footballers in Switzerland
Expatriate soccer players in the United States
Argentine expatriate sportspeople in Brazil
Association football defenders